Wolf Lake is a lake in the Hudson Bay drainage basin located in the Municipal District of Bonnyville No. 87 in census division No. 12, Alberta, Canada. Its primary inflow and outflow is the Wolf River, which flows via the Sand River, Beaver River and Churchill River to Hudson Bay.

References

Municipal District of Bonnyville No. 87
Wolf Lake